is a Japanese physicist active in the field of theoretical cosmology, with particular emphasis on long-range modified models of gravity. He collaborated on these topics with Sergei Odintsov. Nojiri works at the Division of Particle and Astrophysical Science  of the Nagoya University.

External links
S. Nojiri webpage
Research activity and publications of Prof. S. Nojiri
ScienceWatch.com interview
Google Scholar Citations

Japanese physicists
Year of birth missing (living people)
Living people
Cosmologists
Academic staff of Nagoya University